AirPods Max are wireless Bluetooth over-ear headphones designed by Apple, and released on December 15, 2020. They are Apple’s highest-end option in the AirPods lineup, sold alongside the base model AirPods and mid-range AirPods Pro.

The main changes of the AirPods Max over the mid-range AirPods Pro are the over-ear design with larger speakers, inclusion of Apple's Digital Crown (found on the Apple Watch), more color options, and longer battery life.

Overview
Apple announced AirPods Max on December 8, 2020 via a website refresh, and released them on December 15, 2020. AirPods Max features an over-ear headphone design.

AirPods Max have an H1 chip in each ear cup, which is also found in the second-generation AirPods and first-generation AirPods Pro. AirPods Max, like the AirPods Pro, come with Apple's Active Noise Cancellation technology for blocking outside noise, and Transparency mode for listening to sounds around users. The "Digital Crown", similar to that of the Apple Watch, allows users to play or pause audio, control volume, skip tracks, control phone calls, and activate Siri. Proximity sensors automatically detect when they are on a user's head and play or pause audio accordingly. Spatial audio uses built-in gyroscopes and accelerometers to track movement of the user's head and provide what Apple describes as a "theater-like" experience.

Apple claims 20 hours of battery life, with five minutes of charging delivering 1.5 hours of listening time. AirPods Max are charged via the Lightning port. The Lightning port can also be used for line-in audio, with Apple selling cables with USB-A, USB-C and 3.5mm headphone ends.

AirPods Max are bundled with a Smart Case for storing. The Smart Case includes magnets that switch AirPods Max to low-power mode.

AirPods Max is available in five colors: Space Gray, Silver, Sky Blue, Green, and Pink. Users can select from these five colors separately for the ear cushions and external chassis for a total of 25 color combinations (or 125 if using two different ear cushion colors).

Compatibility
AirPods Max are compatible with any device that supports Bluetooth, including Android and Windows devices, although certain features  such as Siri require an Apple device running iOS 14.3, iPadOS 14.3, watchOS 7.2, tvOS 14 or macOS Big Sur.

Criticism 

The AirPods Max Smart Case's design has been mocked by technology reviewers, along with users on Twitter for its resemblance to that of a bra or purse. Reporter Daniel Piper of Creative Bloq states: "If we're not entirely convinced by the design of the AirPods Max themselves, we're utterly baffled by that of their charging 'Smart Case'. The shape resembles, well, lots of things, from handbags to body parts."

Numerous people have reported that condensation can build up near the drivers of the closed-back headphones after prolonged use under the removable ear cups. It has been suspected that the major cause is its full-metal body that naturally has temperature-dependent thermal conductivity.

See also
 Apple headphones
EarPods
AirPods
AirPods Pro
 Google Pixel Buds
 Samsung Galaxy Buds Live

References

Headphones
IPhone accessories
Apple Inc. peripherals
Products introduced in 2020